Nathaniel is a 2015 Philippine drama television series starring Marco Masa as Nathaniel, an angel who returns to earth with a mission to restore the belief of humanity in God and remind them about the innate kindness that everyone possesses in their hearts. The series was aired on ABS-CBN's Primetime Bida evening block and worldwide via The Filipino Channel from April 20 to September 25, 2015, replacing Dream Dad and was replaced by FPJ's Ang Probinsyano.

Synopsis
This is the story of Nathaniel, son of Paul and Rachel Laxamana. As a baby, Nathaniel will be involved in an accident which will cost him his life. Because he died a pure soul, Nathaniel became an Angel upon reaching Heaven. Once he is already 7 years old, he will be sent down to Earth for a mission – to restore people's faith in God, and to remind everyone of their inner kindness, which they may have already forgotten.

Nathaniel lives in Bayan ng Laging Saklolo, wherein he will be adopted by the Bartolome family, which includes Abner, Beth, Dimas, Hannah and Abi. With them, Nathaniel learns the value of having a family. During his stay in earth, Nathaniel will be able to help some people, including his real mother, Rachel, who is now separated from Paul. As he continues with his mission, Nathaniel learns that it was none other than his real father Paul, and his grandmother AVL, who have caused the people of Bayan ng Laging Saklolo to forget about their inner goodness. Nathaniel will do everything in his power to stop Paul and AVL from spreading more evil, without knowing that he is pushing Paul further away from Rachel. However, an evil entity known as the Tagasundo later emerges as the root of all evil and takes human form on Earth with a mission opposite to Nathaniel, to sway humanity from the path of good and will serve as an obstacle to Nathaniel's mission.

Nathaniel successfully defeated the "Tagasundo" with the help of the Three Archangels(Arnel, Josiah, and Eldon), The Other Angels who came down from heaven for the Final Battle, Our Lord Jesus Christ, and the restored faith in humanity sending the Tagasundo back to Hell.

Nathaniel bids farewell to his family, As he finally completed his mission he will watch over his family from heaven and continue to watch the newly changed Bayan ng Laging Saklolo.

Cast and characters

Main cast
 Marco Masa as Nathaniel M. Laxamana
 Shaina Magdayao as Rachel Mercado-Laxamana
 Gerald Anderson as Paul V. Laxamana

Supporting cast
 Coney Reyes as Angela "AVL/ABL" Villanueva-Laxamana
 Pokwang as Elizabeth "Beth" Salvacion-Bartolome
 Benjie Paras as Abner Bartolome
 Isabelle Daza as Martha Amanthe / Mirriam Sandoval
 Sharlene San Pedro as Hannah Bartolome / Mary V. Laxamana
 Jairus Aquino as Joshua
 Jayson Gainza as Dimas Salvacion
 Ogie Diaz as Narcy
 Yesha Camile as Abigail "Abi" Bartolome
 Fourth Solomon as David
 Fifth Solomon as Solomon
 Simon Ibarra as Tomas
 David Chua as Aaron Quiroz
 Ivan Carapiet as Samson Baldemor
 Young JV as Benjamin
 Kathleen Hermosa as Tessie Robles
 Freddie Webb as Punong Maestro
 Leo Martinez / Baron Geisler as Tagasundo

Guest cast

Ratings

Notes

See also
 List of programs broadcast by ABS-CBN
 List of ABS-CBN drama series

References

External links
 
 

ABS-CBN drama series
Fantaserye and telefantasya
2015 Philippine television series debuts
2015 Philippine television series endings
Television series by Dreamscape Entertainment Television
Filipino-language television shows
Television shows set in the Philippines
Angels in television
Christian children's television series
2010s children's television series
Television shows about Catholicism